Placid Lake State Park is a public recreation area located  northeast of Missoula, Montana. The park is known for its scenery, camping, aquatic recreation, and fishing.

History
Placid Lake was named after the Adirondack Mountains' Lake Placid by Hiram Blanchard, a New Yorker who moved to the area in 1892 to form the Clearwater Land and Livestock Company. A dam was completed below the lake's Owl Creek outlet in 1972, and the park was created in 1977.

Activities and amenities
Park facilities include a swimming area, campsites, and boat launch. The park offers an opportunity to view rednecked grebes, ospreys, common loons, and other species of waterfowl.

References

External links

Placid Lake State Park Montana State Parks
Placid Lake State Park Map Montana State Parks

Protected areas of Missoula County, Montana
State parks of Montana
Protected areas established in 1977